Danny Gray  (born April 1, 1999) is an American football wide receiver for the San Francisco 49ers of the National Football League (NFL). He played college football at Blinn and SMU before being drafted by the 49ers in the third round of the 2022 NFL Draft.

Early life and high school
Gray grew up in Dallas, Texas and attended James Madison High School. As a junior, he had 34 receptions for 699 yards and 13 touchdowns and rushed for 159 yards and three touchdowns. Gray was rated a three-star recruit and committed to play college football at Missouri over offers from Kansas, Bowling Green, Florida Atlantic, Grambling State, Tulane, Stephen F. Austin, North Texas and Incarnate Word. He was ruled academically ineligible to play at Missouri and did not enroll.

College career
Gray began his collegiate career at Blinn College in order to meet the academic requirements to play Division I football. As a freshman, he caught 15 passes for 409 yards and six touchdowns and was named first-team All-Southwest Junior College Football Conference. Gray initially committed to transfer to TCU over offers from Auburn, Baylor, Texas Tech, and Tennessee for his final two seasons of eligibility during the summer before his sophomore season. He finished the season with 54 receptions for 877 yards and eight touchdowns. During the season, Gray flipped his commitment to SMU.

Gray became an immediate starter for SMU caught 33 passes for 448 yards and four touchdowns. He was named first-team All-American Athletic Conference as a senior after finishing the season with 49 receptions for 803 yards and nine touchdowns. Following the conclusion of the regular season, Gray announced his decision forgo his final season of NCAA eligibility and enter the 2022 NFL draft.

College statistics

Professional career

Gray was selected by the San Francisco 49ers in the third round (105th overall) of the 2022 NFL Draft.

References

External links
 San Francisco 49ers bio
 SMU Mustangs bio
 Blinn Buccaneers bio

Living people
American football wide receivers
SMU Mustangs football players
Players of American football from Dallas
Blinn Buccaneers football players
1999 births
San Francisco 49ers players